Suneel Verma is an Indian politician and a former member of the 17th Legislative Assembly in India. He represented the Laharpur constituency of Uttar Pradesh and is a member of the Bharatiya Janata Party.

References

Uttar Pradesh MLAs 2017–2022
Bharatiya Janata Party politicians from Uttar Pradesh
People from Sitapur district
Living people
1975 births